Pet Check Technology is an online software and mobile application for dog walking companies and dog walking customers. Using QR codes, mobile apps, e-mail alerts and GPS tracking, Pet Check Technology allows customers to see when and where their dogs went with their walkers. Pet Check Technology launched in the Los Angeles area in August 2011 and has plans to expand to major cities in the upcoming months.

About 
Pet Check Technology was created in 2011 by Doug Simon, founder of Chicago-based dog walking company, Walk the Dog. Pet Check Technology was created by Walk the Dog to ensure that dogs were being walked for the time allotted on the dog walker's schedule.

Pet Check Technology provides dog walking companies with online tools for scheduling clients, billing, and tracking dog-walking employees. For customers, Pet Check allows them to see exactly when their dog was taken out for a walk, where they went, and what time they got back.

How it works 
The dog walker scans a QR code with the Pet Check mobile app for iOS or Android when arriving to pick up a dog. The app displays their schedule as well as any notes (such as number of stops and interaction with other dogs) for customer walk reports. GPS tracks the walk and another QR code scan lets the customer know when the walk ends. Pet Check sends an e-mail alert each time the customer's QR code is scanned. The customer can then watch the walk happen on an online map. Completed walk reports are stored for future reference. Dog walking companies using Pet Check Technology have the ability to choose a customer payment method that works best for their business.

References

External links 
 Pet Tracking Technology
 Walk the Dog

Dogs
Mobile software